Botany Bay is a small bight between Cape Geology and Discovery Bluff in the south part of Granite Harbor, Victoria Land. Mapped by the Western Geological Party of the British Antarctic Expedition under Scott, who explored the Granite Harbor area in 1911–12. Named by T. Griffith Taylor and Frank Debenham, Australian members of the party, after Botany Bay, Australia.

References

Landforms of Victoria Land